Avalon was an upcoming television mystery drama series for ABC starring Neve Campbell, from Michael Connelly and David E. Kelley.

Synopsis 
Nicole (Nic) Searcy runs the sheriff department on the Catalina Island city of Avalon when a terrifying discovery is made.

Cast 
 Neve Campbell as Detective Nicole Searcy
 Steven Pasquale as Detective William Claypool
 Roslyn Ruff as Lena
 Alexa Mansour as Carolyn Chavez
 Demetrius Grosse as Dayo Musa

Production
ABC gave a straight-to-series order to Avalon, based on the 20th Television short story of the same name by Michael Connolly which was published as part of his 2021 short short collection When A Stranger Comes To Town. David E. Kelley will write the pilot with both Kelley and Connelly co-creators and executive producers. The series production is by A + E Studios and 20th Television with Barry Jossen, Tana Jamieson, and Ross Fineman also executive producing.  On April 12, 2022, Dana Calvo joined the series as the showrunner and an executive producer. In August 2022, Neve Campbell was added to the cast as Detectice Nicole ‘Nic’ Searcy. On August 19, 2022 Steven Pasquale was added to the cast.

Broadcast
The series was part of ABC’s programming slate for their 2022-23 schedule. On November 19, 2022, ABC canceled the series with A + E Studios currently shopping around to other networks.

References

English-language television shows
American detective television series
Fictional portrayals of the Los Angeles Police Department